Jackie is a 2012 Dutch comedy-drama film directed by Antoinette Beumer, from an idea by Marnie Block and Karen van Holst Pellekaan. The leading roles are played by Carice van Houten, her real-life sister Jelka van Houten and Academy Award winner Holly Hunter.

Plot
Sofie (Carice van Houten) and Daan (Jelka van Houten) are twin sisters who were raised by two fathers (Paul Hoes and Jaap Spijkers). When they get a phone call from America that their biological mother, Jackie (Holly Hunter) is in a hospital with a complicated leg fracture awaiting transfer to a rehabilitation center, the two end up in an adventure where everything they believed in is called into question. This results in an unforgettable journey to New Mexico with the strange and inappropriate Jackie  where the lives of the two sisters will change forever.

Cast
Carice van Houten - Sophie
Jelka van Houten - Daan, Sophie's twin sister
Holly Hunter - Jackie, Sophie & Daan's biological mother
Jaap Spijkers - Harm, Sophie & Daan's father
Paul Hoes - Marcel, Sophie & Daan's father
Jeroen Spitzenberger - Joost, Daan's husband
Hajo Bruins - Robert, Sophie's boss
Elise Schaap - Rosa, one of Sophie's co-workers
Howe Gelb - Paul

References

External links
 

2012 films
2012 comedy-drama films
2010s Dutch-language films
Dutch comedy-drama films